Walter Liese (31 January 1926 – 24 February 2023) was a German forestry and wood researcher and wood biologist.

Early life and education 
Liese was born in Berlin on 31 January 1926, and grew up in Eberswalde. He studied forestry at the University of Freiburg and the University of Göttingen. He obtained his PhD in 1951 under Prof. Herbert Zycha.

Academic and research career 
In 1963, Liese became Professor at the University of Hamburg. He searched about the wood and bark anatomy, wood quality, bamboo and many other subjects, having more than 500 publications. In 1991, he became an Emeritus professor. He was also honorary member of the Association of German Wood Scientists (Bund Deutscher Holzwirte) and an elected member in the International Academy of Wood Science (IAWS).

Liese was the co-editor of many scientific journals, e.g.:
Holz als Roh- und Werkstoff
Wood Science and Technology
Forstwissenschaftliches Centralblatt
Cellulose: Chemistry, Technology
Journal of Tropical Forest Science
Journal of Bamboo and Rattan
World Bamboo and Rattan

Literature 
 Horst Schulz: Professor Dr. Dr. h.c. mult. Walter Liese – 65 Jahre, in: Holz als Roh- und Werkstoff 49 (1991), P. 75–84 (Today: European Journal of Wood and Wood Products)
 Olaf Schmidt: Walter Liese 75 years young, in: Holzforschung 55 (2001), P. 104–105
 Dieter Eckstein, Uwe Schmitt: Trees and wood for life: Walter Liese 80 years old, in: Wood Science and Technology Volume 40, Number 1, 2–3

Death 
Liese died on 27 February 2023, at the age of 97.

References 

1926 births
2023 deaths
People from Eberswalde
German foresters
Academic staff of the University of Hamburg
Academic staff of the Ludwig Maximilian University of Munich
Members of the Polish Academy of Sciences
Forestry academics
University of Freiburg alumni
University of Göttingen alumni